Paul Ward (born 1964)  was Head of the Department of English, History and Creative Writing and Professor of Public History and Community Heritage at Edge Hill University in Ormskirk, Lancashire. He was Professor of Modern British History at the University of Huddersfield until 2018. He received both his BA and PhD from  Queen Mary and Westfield College. He has taught at London Guildhall University, Middlesex University, University of Westminster and Royal Holloway. In 2004, he was visiting lecturer at the University of A Coruña;  in 2004–5, he was Fulbright-Robertson Professor of British History at Westminster College, Missouri. Ward is the author of four books, relating to national identities in the United Kingdom. He is best known for his work on Britishness.
He has since retired, living with his wife, children and granddaughter at their family home.

References

Alumni of the University of London
Academics of the University of London
Place of birth missing (living people)
1964 births
Living people